Márcio Fabiano Giovanini (born 17 October 1978 in Londrina, Paraná) is a Brazilian-Italian footballer who currently plays for Navibank Saigon F.C. in the V-League.

Career
Giovanini has played in Brazil, Germany, Israel, Belgium, Portugal, Greece and now in Vietnam.

In January 2009, Giovanini went on trial with Birmingham City F.C.

He moved to Mes in summer 2009. In January 2011, he moved to Navibank Saigon F.C.

References 

Living people
1978 births
Brazilian footballers
Italian footballers
2. Bundesliga players
1. FC Saarbrücken players
R. Charleroi S.C. players
Associação Naval 1º de Maio players
J. Malucelli Futebol players
Fortaleza Esporte Clube players
Campinense Clube players
Maccabi Tel Aviv F.C. players
Maccabi Petah Tikva F.C. players
Veria F.C. players
Sanat Mes Kerman F.C. players
Brazilian expatriate footballers
Expatriate footballers in Iran
Expatriate footballers in Germany
Expatriate footballers in Portugal
Expatriate footballers in Belgium
Expatriate footballers in Israel
Expatriate footballers in Greece
Navibank Sài Gòn FC players
Association football central defenders
Sportspeople from Londrina